The Blazing World is a 2021 American fantasy horror-thriller film written and directed by Carlson Young (in her feature film directorial debut) and co-written by Pierce Brown. The film stars Udo Kier, Dermot Mulroney, Vinessa Shaw, Soko, John Karna, Young and Edith González in her final film role before her death in 2019. The film is loosely inspired by Margaret Cavendish's 1666 work of the same name. In 2018, Young wrote, directed and starred in the short film of the same name, prior to expanding the basis and ideas for the full-length film. It is the first in a planned trilogy of films entitled Saturn Returns.

Cast
 Udo Kier as Lained
 Dermot Mulroney as Tom Winter
 Vinessa Shaw as Alice Winter
 Soko as Margot
 John Karna as Blake
 Carlson Young as 	Margaret Winter
 Liz Mikel as Dr. Cruz

Release
The film had its world premiere at the 2021 Sundance Film Festival on January 31, 2021 in the Next section.

Reception
The review aggregator website Rotten Tomatoes had it with a 59% rating based on reviews from 49 critics. The site's consensus reads, "The Blazing World's scattershot script isn't always able to support writer-director-star Carlson Young's ambitions, but its arresting visuals hold the attention". On Metacritic it has a score of 33% based on reviews from 9 critics, indicating "generally unfavorable reviews".

Meagan Navarro of Bloody Disgusting wrote "Young's debut is ambitious and refuses to adhere to commercial conformity. It may not hit its emotional marks or substantially reinvent trauma depictions, but it's hard to ever be bored by a film that plays like a whimsical horror-fairy tale on acid".

Monica Castillo and Kristy Puchko of RogerEbert.com had a different take on the film. According to Puchko, the film "is impressive" and "awe[s] with outrageousness", while Castillo's take is that "The Blazing World falls short narratively and visually".

The Hollywood Reporters Frank Scheck commented that "There's plenty of imagination on display in The Blazing World, but it's buried amidst the narrative and stylistic self-indulgence that assumes we'll be interested in going on this very strange and ultimately enervating journey".

Guy Lodge of Variety expressed a mixed reaction, stating that the film "throws an ornate heap of production design at an anemically scripted psychological metaphor, and counts on a combination of fairy dust and sheer determined nerve to make the whole contraption fly".

Sarah Jane of The Austin Chronicle, called the film "overstuffed and overextended". She praised the soundtrack (especially the songs by Isom Innis and Sean Cimino as Peel), which (along with Soko's appearance) "buoyed" the film.

References

External links
 

2021 horror thriller films
2021 independent films
American romantic fantasy films
American comedy horror films
American historical romance films
2020s adventure comedy films
2020s fantasy comedy films
American horror thriller films
American independent films
Films based on novels
Films based on horror novels
2021 comedy horror films
2021 directorial debut films
Features based on short films
2020s English-language films
2020s American films